The 1974 Sun Bowl was a college football bowl game between the Mississippi State Bulldogs and the North Carolina Tar Heels.

Background
Mississippi State tied for fourth in the Southeastern Conference while the Tar Heels tied for second in the Atlantic Coast Conference. This was the first Sun Bowl for the Bulldogs and the first bowl game since 1963. The Tar Heels had appeared in the Sun Bowl just two years earlier. A freak winter storm the night before the game left frost on the field. The morning warmth of the sun created a rising steam from the field during the first half, thus inspiring the game to be one of three football games to be nicknamed the "Fog Bowl".

Game summary
On the first play, Terry Vitrano ran for 55 yards, which set the tone for the rest of the game.

Mississippi State – Packer 1 yard touchdown run (Nickels kick)
North Carolina – Betterson 1 yard touchdown run (Alexander kick)
Mississippi State – Nickels 24 yard field goal
North Carolina – Betterson 6 yard touchdown run (Alexander kick)
Mississippi State – Packer 16 yard touchdown run (Nickels kick)
North Carolina – Jerome 29 yard touchdown pass from Kupec (Alexander kick)
Mississippi State – Nickels 32 yard field goal
North Carolina – Alexander 26 yard field goal
Mississippi State – Vitrano 2 yard touchdown run (kick failed)

Terry Vitrano rushed for 164 yards on 20 carries with one touchdown en route to being named MVP of the game. His teammate Walter Packer ran for 183 yards on 24 attempts, for two touchdowns. The 455 yards of rushing by the Bulldogs established a new Sun Bowl record.

Aftermath
The Bulldogs returned to the Sun Bowl in 1980 while the Tar Heels reappeared in 1994.

Statistics

References

Sun Bowl
Sun Bowl
North Carolina Tar Heels football bowl games
Mississippi State Bulldogs football bowl games
December 1974 sports events in the United States
Sun Bowl
Nicknamed sporting events